Shiv Singh Chak is an Indian politician and a member of the 13th Legislative Assembly of India. He represents the Tundla constituency of Uttar Pradesh and is a member of the Bhartiya Janata Party political party.

Early life and education 
Shiv Singh Chak was born in Tundla district. He is educated till 12th.

Political career 
Shiv Singh Chak has been a MLA for one term. He represented the Tundla constituency and is a member of the Bhartiya Janata Party political party.

References 

1964 births
Bharatiya Janata Party politicians from Uttar Pradesh
Living people